The Cholan Express is a superfast express train operated by the Southern Railway zone of the Indian Railways. This train connects  and Tiruchchirappalli via Viluppuram, Kumbakonam and Thanjavur in the Indian state of Tamil Nadu.

New LHB coach has been installed for this train since 16 February 2017.

Relevance
Train is named after the Chola Kingdom which ruled over the regions through which the train passes. The Cholas ruled over their kingdom from their capital in Thanjavur, Poombuhar.

Coach composition

See also
 Pallavan Superfast Express
 Rockfort (Malaikottai) Superfast Express
 Uzhavan Express
 Chennai Egmore–Karaikal Kamban Express
 Mayiladuthurai–Mysore Express
 Pearl City (Muthunagar) Superfast Express
 Kanniyakumari Superfast Express
 Vaigai Superfast Express
 Pandian Superfast Express
 Sethu Express
 Anantapuri Express
 Mannai Express

References

External links

Named passenger trains of India
Rail transport in Tamil Nadu
Express trains in India